William Annesley was an Irish Anglican Dean.

Annesley was educated at Trinity College Dublin. He was Dean of Down from 1787 until his death in 1817.

References 

Irish Anglicans
1817 deaths
Alumni of Trinity College Dublin
Deans of Down
18th-century English Anglican priests
17th-century English Anglican priests